The MRT Blue Line or MRT Chaloem Ratchamongkon Line is Bangkok's third rapid transit line, following the Sukhumvit line and Silom line of the BTS Skytrain. It is the first of the MRT system and is operated by Bangkok Expressway and Metro (BEM). The original  MRT Blue Line from Hua Lamphong to Bang Sue opened on 3 July 2004. A  extension to Tao Poon opened on 11 August 2017. The  western extension to Lak Song opened for full service on 29 September 2019 and the  extension from Tao Poon to Tha Phra to form the quasi loop, opened for full service on 30 March 2020.

The MRT Blue line connects major business, residential and cultural areas of Bangkok. In late 2019, the average daily ridership was 400,000. In mid 2021, during a COVID-19 3rd wave in Bangkok ridership plummeted to between 76,000 - 116,000 per weekday.

Route alignment
The MRT Blue Line starts at the upper platform of Tha Phra station. It runs on an elevated viaduct northward along Charan Sanit Wong Road to Bang O station. Then turning eastwards crossing the Chao Phraya River, entering Bang Pho station and Tao Poon station in Bang Sue District. The line then descends to an underground section. It follows the Kamphaeng Phet, Phahon Yothin and Lat Phrao Roads, then turns south following Ratchadaphisek Road to Queen Sirikit National Convention Centre station. It then turns west following Rama IV Road. It passes Hua Lamphong station in Pathum Wan District, through Chinatown, then under the Chao Phraya River before ascending onto an elevated viaduct to the lower platform of Tha Phra station. The line continues west along Phet Kasem Road to Lak Song station in Bang Khae, situated near Kanchanaphisek Road or Western Outer Ring road. It forms a quasi circle loop around Bangkok.

History

Officially named Chaloem Ratchamongkhon (Thai สายเฉลิมรัชมงคล) – "Celebration of Royal Auspice" – or informally but commonly called as the "MRT Blue Line", this was the first metro line under the newly formed government agency, the Mass Rapid Transit Authority of Thailand (MRTA). Most civil infrastructure was provided by this government agency and handed over to a private sector on a 25-year concessionaire agreement. The winning bidder was Bangkok Expressway and Metro (BEM). Under this agreement, BEM provides maintenance and engineering equipment, including electrical trains, signalling systems, SCADA, communication, platform screen doors and fully operate the system from Hua Lamphong to Bang Sue. BEM has subcontracted maintenance of the system for 10 years to Siemens and seven-year maintenance contracts to two local maintenance services.

Construction of the line from Hua Lamphong to Bang Sue began on 19 November 1996. The project suffered multiple delays not only because of the 1997 economic crisis, but also due to challenging civil engineering works of constructing massive underground structures deep in the water-logged soil upon which the city is built. The MRT Blue Line opened for a limited public trial period of several weeks starting on 13 April 2004. On 3 July 2004, the line was officially opened at 19:19 local time by HM King Bhumibol and Queen Sirikit who were accompanied by other members of the royal family. Within 30 minutes of its opening, sightseers filled the system to its maximum capacity, but after the initial rush ridership settled down to around 180,000 riders daily — considerably lower than projections of over 400,000, despite fares being slashed in half from 12 to 38 baht to 10-15 baht per trip.

Extension to Tao Poon 
As part of the rapid transit master plan the original MRT Blue Line section was planned to be extended from Hua Lamphong to Lak Song, and from Bang Sue to Tha Phra, forming a circle open-loop route. The contract for the first part of extension to Tao Poon was signed on 26 August 2009 as part of MRT Purple Line contract as it provided interchange to the MRT Purple Line. The  Bang Sue to Tao Poon extension opened on 11 August 2017. This added the first elevated station, Tao Poon, to the Blue line.

Extensions to Lak Song and Tha Phra 
The major extension of the MRT Blue Line was the  extension west to Lak Song and from Tao Poon to Tha Phra with 19 stations consisting of four underground and 15 elevated stations. Contracts for civil work were divided into five contracts. Successful bids were announced in late 2010. On 17 February 2011, the five contracts were signed.

Construction commenced in mid-2011 for a scheduled 2016 opening but this was subsequently delayed to 2019–2020. In August, 2017, BEM awarded the automatic fare collection ticket for the extension to Thales which to install its TransCity system. The contract also includes ongoing training and future support. In September 2017, BEM announced that Siemens and ST Electronics Thailand were awarded the contract (Contract 5) to supply, install and maintain the E&S systems systems, install station platform screen doors and fit out the depot. Siemens also won the contract to supply 35 sets of rolling stock.

In 2017, the cabinet approved the amendment of the Blue line concession with BEM, and the new agreement was signed on 31 March 2017. Under the new agreement, BEM will operate the new extensions from Hua Lampong to Lak Song and Bang Sue to Tha Phra. The concession period was extended from 2029 to 2050.

The extension was opened in stages. The Hua Lamphong - Lak Song extension was opened for trial service on 29 July with full commercial services commencing 29 September 2019.

The Tao Poon - Tha Phra extension opened for limited trial services from 29 November 2019 with full commercial services commencing on 30 March 2020.

Rolling stock 
The MRT Blue line is served by 54 three-car trains of which, 19 are first generation Siemens Modular Metro sets and 35 sets are second generation.

First generation 
19 three-car Siemens Modular Metro were ordered for the initial part of the line. The trains entered service on 3 July 2004. In 2017, BEM starts removing some seats from the train to increase interior space to cope with rising number of passengers. In 2019, the BEM stated that it is interested in refurbishing the first generation trains. Including the CCTV cameras, and new dynamic route map replacing the traditional ones.

Second generation 
In 2017, BEM ordered 35 three-car Siemens Modular Metros as part of the line extension program. Under the contract, Siemens were to supply 35 trains and provide maintenance for ten years with a price tag of 20 billion baht. The fleet was built at the Siemens plant in Vienna and tested in Germany. The first train arrived in 2019 with all trains delivered by early 2020.

Operation
The MRT Blue line runs from Tha Phra to Lak Song via Bang Sue, Phra Ram 9 and Hua Lamphong, serving 38 stations. The line operates everyday from 6am to midnight with headway of 4 minutes during rush hour and a maximum headway of 8 minutes after 10 pm.

All stations on the line are equipped with platform screen doors. Stations are built to accommodate six-car trains, but only three-car trains were used. Uniformed security personnel and security cameras are present at every platform. Passenger announcements on this line are made by journalist and news broadcaster Sarocha Pornudomsak. The line has 2 depots, one in Huai Khwang District, which is located between Phra Ram 9 and Thailand Cultural Centre station. The 2nd depot is located in Chom Thong District, near Phetkasem 48 station.

Fares increased by 1 baht from 1 January 2021. For example, a one station journey increases to Bt17 from Bt16, four stations to Bt24 from Bt23, seven stations to Bt31 from Bt30 and 10 stations to Bt38 from Bt37. The maximum fare is 42 baht.

Ridership
At opening in 2004, initial ridership was 180,000 per day — considerably lower than the projections of over 400,000. By 2016, the average daily ridership was 273,637. By September 2017, BEM stated that average daily ridership had increased to 360,000 after the opening of the extension to Tao Poon.

After the opening of the extension to Lak Song on 29 September 2019, average daily ridership increased to 400,000. The MRT Blue line was expected to grow to a daily ridership of 800,000 once the Lak Song and Tha Phra extensions opened. However, the impact of the COVID-19 pandemic by late 2020 had resulted in a dramatic reduction of ridership down to an average of 360,000 per weekday reverting to September 2017 levels. By August 2021, during a COVID-19 3rd wave in Bangkok ridership plummeted to only 76,000 per weekday.

Accident record
On 17 January 2005, just after 09:15, an empty train returning to the depot collided with a peak-hour train filled with passengers at the Thailand Cultural Centre station. Around 100-262 people, depending on the news source, were injured. Most of whom sustained only minor injuries, and the entire Metro network was shut down for two weeks. On 31 January 2005, then prime minister Thaksin Shinawatra rode the metro to increase public confidence in the system.

After initial investigations, it was found that the empty train had run into problems shortly before the accident, grinding to a halt on a curve leading to the depot. The driver applied its brake and was waiting to be towed to the depot close to Thailand Cultural Centre station. A rescue train was attempting to connect to the stalled train when the driver was told to release the brake while coupling had not yet been successful. It was then that the empty train began to roll backwards at a speed of ten meters per second, before smashing into the other train, which was carrying passengers. Therefore, it was believed that the incident was caused by negligence due to insufficient training of operation staff. This accident also resulted in two damaged trains with heavily damaged areas limited to the two leading cars. The colliding speed was suspected to be about 60 km/h due to the appearance of damaged areas. However, one train, which was rebuilt from the repair of the minor-damaged cars, was already fitted for operation at the end of 2006 and the remaining one was still under heavy repair until mid of 2007; it was released into service in October 2007. The cost resulting from the accident might be a much higher figure than BEM quoted, and it was expected to be at least 400 million baht, which was totally insured by a local insurance company.

The line resumed full operations on 1 February 2005. Passenger numbers soon rose back to pre-crash levels, partly due to a temporary promotional fare scheme which allowed passengers to travel any distance on the MRT for only ten baht.

Stations

Line map

Network map

Future extensions
Since 2011, there were requests from residents to extend the line farther from Lak Song west to the Phutthamonthon area. The MRTA indicated a willingness to undertake this extension. In July 2014, the MRTA submitted a request for 84 million baht to complete a route survey for a 7.8 km, 4 station extension from Lak Song to Phutthamonthon Sai 4. In late March 2017, the Transport Ministry stated that this 7.8 km extension would be submitted to Cabinet for approval in April 2017 with construction expected to commence in the 4th quarter of 2017. However, the tender was subsequently delayed until late 2019 due to other projects. In late 2019, the project was put on hold due to government budget constraints. In August 2021, the MRTA confirmed that the extension was not a priority especially given delays with the tenders for the MRT Orange and MRT Purple line extensions.

See also 

 Mass Rapid Transit Master Plan in Bangkok Metropolitan Region
 MRT (Bangkok)
 MRT Brown Line
 MRT Grey Line
 MRT Light Blue Line
 MRT Orange Line
 MRT Pink Line
 MRT Purple Line
 MRT Yellow Line
 BTS Skytrain
 BTS Sukhumvit Line
 BTS Silom Line
 AERA1 City
 SRT Light Red Line
 SRT Dark Red Line
 Bangkok BRT
 BMA Gold Line

References

External links

 
 "MRTA Blue Line extension website" (archived)
 Airport Rail Link, BTS, MRT & BRT network map

MRT (Bangkok) lines
2004 establishments in Thailand
Railway lines opened in 2004